Acacia attenuata is a shrub belonging to the genus Acacia and the subgenus Phyllodineae. It is native to an area in south eastern Queensland. It was listed as a vulnerable species in 2009 according to the Environment Protection and Biodiversity Conservation Act 1999.

Description
It has persistent juvenile bipinnate leaves. When it blooms it produces simple inflorescences of spherical flower-heads containing 20 to 35 cream to pale yellow coloured flowers. Following flowering seed pods form usually around June–July with the pods reaching maturity in the springtime between October and November.

Distribution
It has an estimated total population of between 1,000 to 2,500 plants inhabiting approximately 26 individual locations. The highly fragmented distribution is a result of habitat destruction and clearing, mostly from urban development pressures.

See also
 List of Acacia species

References

attenuata
Flora of Queensland
Plants described in 1927
Taxa named by Joseph Maiden
Taxa named by William Blakely